Twenty Million Questions is a Canadian public affairs television series which aired on CBC Television from 1966 to 1969.

Premise
This weekly half-hour series featured documentary and interview footage regarding topics of national concern. Its hosts were Carleton University political science professor Donald Gordon and journalist Charles Lynch. Episode directors included Ed Reid and Moses Znaimer. Bernard Ostry served as series Production Supervisor.

Scheduling

Season 1 - 1966-67

Episodes were broadcast on Thursdays at 10 p.m., from 6 October 1966 to 30 March 1967.

 6 October 1966 - the debut episode concerned the political realm
 13 October 1966 - a report on the Liberal Party's gathering in Ottawa, including an interview with Lester B. Pearson
 20 October 1966 - an interview with Quebec Premier Daniel Johnson, Sr.
 2 February 1967 - "Take Sweden for Instance", a documentary profile of that nation including its economic situation, international relations and labour movement
 30 March 1967 - "The Young Contenders", profiles of young Canadian politicians Jean Chrétien, David MacDonald, Charles Taylor and John Turner

Season 2 - 1967-68

Episodes were broadcast on Wednesdays at 9 p.m. for the second season from 13 September 1967 to 26 June 1968.

 20 September 1967 - Eric Kierans is guest interviewer of John James Deutsch of Queen's University
 27 September 1967 - Claude Ryan joins Charles Lynch to interview Lester B. Pearson.
 26 June 1968 - recap of the previous day's national election

Season 3 - 1968-69

This final season of episodes was broadcast on Tuesdays at 10:30 p.m. for its final season from 17 September 1968 to 24 June 1969.

 24 June 1969 - in this final episode, Charles Lynch interviews Pierre Trudeau at his Prime Minister's residence

References

External links
 
 "The Contender" with John Turner, at CBC Archives (30 March 1967)
 "The political up-and-comer" with Jean Chretien, Mitchell Sharp, at CBC Archives (30 March 1967)

CBC Television original programming
1966 Canadian television series debuts
1969 Canadian television series endings
1960s Canadian television news shows